Ayandeh (in Persian:آینده) is an opinion poll organisation in Iran that was closed down in 2002. 

One of Ayandeh's directors, Abbas Abdi, was arrested in at his home on 4 November 2002, accused of "having received money from either the US polling firm Gallup or a foreign embassy".  Abdi spent several years in prison as a result. The BBC claimed that this was part of "a crackdown by the hard-line judiciary on organisations conducting public opinion polls" at the time.

References

Polling